Taganga is a traditional fishing village and corregimiento of Santa Marta, located on the Caribbean coast of Colombia at about 10 minutes or  north of Santa Marta. Both Santa Marta and Taganga were founded by Rodrigo de Bastidas on July 29, 1525, making them two of the oldest remaining colonial settlements in present-day Colombia.

The touristic town and backpacker hub is famous for its sunsets, diving and access to the Tayrona National Natural Park. Bohemian and richly decorated Taganga is full of hostels and forms part of the South American Gringo Trail. In the months of July and August the village is visited by many Israelis who finished their military draft period.

Etymology 
The source of the name Taganga is uncertain; it is either derived from the Taganga people inhabiting the area before the Spanish conquest, from the words ta and gunmy; "Snake mountain range" or from the Tairona words ta and ganga; "Entrance of the sea".

Geography and geology 

Taganga is located on the northern coast of Colombia, at the northwestern flank of the Sierra Nevada de Santa Marta, the triangular mountain range in northern Colombia hosting the double peak Pico Cristóbal Colón and Pico Simón Bolívar, the highest mountain(s) closest to the sea in the world.

It is home to the Tairona people and to a rich biodiversity. The mountain range is thought to have formed from to the easternward movement of the Caribbean Plate, along the Oca Fault, which forms the boundary with the South American Plate.

The area around Tanganga geologically forms part of the Santa Marta Supergroup with main rock types metamorphic rocks as phyllites and amphibolites. The phyllites are overlain by the Ciénaga Marble. The greenish phyllites are rich in phyllosilicates, amphiboles and large crystals of pyrite, while the amphibolites contain quartzite veins showing stockwork patterns surrounded by muscovite. The contact of the two metamorphic facies is located within Taganga.

The urban center of Taganga is situated on alluvial fan deposits fed by the hinterland of the foothills of the Sierra Nevada de Santa Marta.

Analysis of actinolite minerals in the phyllites of Taganga produced Lower and Mid-Cretaceous ages, which is much older than the Rodadero Formation outcropping south of Santa Marta.

Taganga Fault 

The Taganga Fault is the tectonic lineament separating the village of Taganga from the Tayrona Park in the north. The activity of the NE-trending fault has produced carbonitization of the phyllites. The fault is a reverse fault that is characterized by serpentinites, the presence of epidote and the formation of talc minerals.

Climate 

From November 2015 to May 2016 a strong drought was present in Taganga; it only rained for one day in this period.

History 

In the time before the arrival of the Spanish, Santa Marta was populated by the Gaira indigenous people. Taganga was inhabited by the Taganga, under the leadership of a cacique. In those ages the population of Taganga was substantial.

The first European sighting of the mainland of South America was by Christopher Columbus at his third voyage to the Americas in August 1498 when he sailed through the Gulf of Paria separating the island of Trinidad with mainland present-day Venezuela. Although Colombia is named after Columbus, he never saw the lands of current Colombia. The furtherst south Columbus went was in present-day Panama, that until 1903 was part of (Gran) Colombia. One of Columbus's competitors, Alonso de Ojeda, was the first conquistador who set foot on mainland Colombia in 1499. In 1502, the Colombian Caribbean coast stretching from the Needle Cape (Cabo de la Aguja) until the Gulf of Urabá, was explored for the first time. In 1514, the Sierra Nevada de Santa Marta was explored and on July 29, 1525, day of Santa Martha, her sister María and her brother Lázaro, the oldest colonial city of South America; Santa Marta, was founded by Rodrigo de Bastidas. Chronicler Juan de Castellanos visited Taganga in 1534.

In the 17th century, at the time of the encomiendas, the area from Santa Marta to Riohacha was ruled by governor Diego Fernández de Argote y Córdoba. The church of Taganga was built after the hermitage made of clay was destroyed in the earthquake of May 22, 1834. The earthquake was the result of tectonic movements of the Oca Fault.

Modern history 

Until the 1950s, Taganga was an isolated fishing village due to the lack of road access from Santa Marta. In 1988 there was only one hotel in Taganga.

Since August 1998 Taganga is a separate corregimiento again and on December 12, 2014, Taganga was incorporated into a locality for improvement of the local conditions.

Pollution of the sea and projects for water treatment have gotten the attention of the authorities in the 21st century.

Taganga, located on the southern edge of the Tayrona National Park, suffers from illegal construction in the park area, designated protected land.

The village has a cultural center organizing festivities for the local residents. The center was established in 2004.

West of the football pitch of Taganga, since 2015 a park is under construction.

Sex and drug tourism

In 2015, an Israeli ex-soldier constructed a large hotel complex, including bars, swimming pool and tennis court, to accommodate Israeli travelers, notably ex-soldiers who ended their military service. In 2017, the hotel became increasingly known for providing drugs and prostitutes  to its customers, as well as organizing  orgy-like parties. Some of the prostitutes were minors.

At the end of 2017, the owner was summoned to a migration office in Santa Marta, arrested and deported after presenting a risk to ″public safety and social tranquillity″.

Following the arrest, locals found that the security has improved.

Economy 

Main economical activity of the traditional village is fishing. The majority of the local population is active in the fishing industry with fishermen leaving the harbour early in the morning.

Commercial fishing 
These and other fish species are caught around Taganga:
 Centropomus undecimalis, róbalo; common snook
 Eugerres plumieris, mojarra rayada; mojarra
 Mugil incilis, mojarra lisa; Parassi mullet
 Megalops atlanticus, sábalo; Atlantic tarpon

Tourism 

Since the construction of the road to Santa Marta in 1953, Taganga has been growing to become an important touristic village with numerous hotels, hostels and restaurant arising in the late 20th and early 21st century. The character of the backpacker hotspot is bohemian with various murals decorating the village. Most of the streets are unpaved.

Especially famous for Taganga are its sunsets; people come from Santa Marta to watch them on the beach. The colours can vary from orange to pink, depending on the atmospheric conditions.

Friction between the traditional local population of the village and the growing hostel industry mostly by foreign investments has been present in the 20th and 21st century.

Diving 

Taganga is the starting point for one of the main dive locations of Colombia. The Malpelo and Gorgona Island reserves are the Pacific dive sites of the country, while diving around San Andrés y Providencia, the Rosario and San Bernardo Corals National Natural Park off the coast of Cartagena and in Tayrona Park is done in the Caribbean. More than ten dive centers offer courses of all levels at low cost in Taganga. The prices are among the lowest of the Caribbean, competing with Panama and Utila, Honduras.

Various types of corals, sponges, sea turtles, molluscs, crustaceans and over 129 species of fish have been identified in the waters around Taganga and Tayrona Park. Most of the diving is concentrated around Isla Aguja ("Needle Island").

Underwater fauna that can be encountered in the vicinity of Taganga are among others:
 Hippocampus reidi, cabillito de mar; slender seahorse
 Hippocampus erectus, lined seahorse
 Pterois volitans, pez león; red lionfish (invasive species, hunted)
 Sphyraena barracuda, gran barracuda; great barracuda
 Stegastes partitus; bicolor damselfish
 Acanthurus bahianus; ocean surgeon
 Chromis cyanea; blue chromis
 Sparisoma aurofrenatum; redband parrotfish
 Myripristis jacobus; blackbar soldierfish
 Halichoeres garnoti; yellowhead wrasse
 Haemulon flavolineatum; French grunt
 Chaetodon sedentarius; reef butterflyfish
 Abudefduf saxatilis; sergeant major
 Acanthurus coeruleus; blue tang
 Canthigaster rostrata; Caribbean sharp-nose puffer
 Haemulon chrysargyreum; yellowstripe grunt
 Mulloidichthys martinicus; yellow goatfish
 Bodianus rufus; Spanish hogfish
 Pseudupeneus maculatus; spotted goatfish
 Sparisoma viride; stoplight parrotfish
 Thalassoma bifasciatum; bluehead wrasse
 Synodus intermedius; sand diver
 Ocyurus chrysurus; yellowtail snapper
 Holocentrus adscensionis; squirrelfish
 Pomacanthus arcuatus; gray angelfish
 Clepticus parrae; Creole wrasse
 Diodon holocanthus; longspined porcupinefish
 Chaetodon ocellatus; spotfin butterflyfish
 Microspathodon chrysurus; jewel damselfish
 Serranus tabacarius; tobaccofish
 Amblycirrhitus pinos; redspotted hawkfish
 Prognathodes aculeatus; longsnout butterflyfish
 Holocanthus ciliaris; queen angelfish
 Scarus taeniopterus; princess parrotfish
 Chaetodon striatus; banded butterflyfish
 Scarus iseri; striped parrotfish
 Lactophrys triqueter; smooth trunkfish
 Cephalopholis cruentata; graysby
 Chaetodon capistratus; foureye butterflyfish
 Holacanthus tricolor; rock beauty
 Pomacanthus paru; French angelfish
 Haemulon plumierii; white grunt
 Acanthostracion polygonius; honeycomb cowfish
 Gymnothorax moringa; spotted moray

Gallery

Panoramas

See also 

Spanish conquest of the Muisca
Ciudad Perdida, San Gil, Suesca, Tayrona National Natural Park

References

Bibliography

External links 

 Taganga on Lonely Planet
 Diving in Taganga

Santa Marta
Tourist attractions in Magdalena Department
Populated places in the Magdalena Department
Populated places established in 1525
1525 establishments in the Spanish Empire
Fishing communities
Underwater diving sites in the Caribbean
Underwater diving sites in Colombia